3-Quinuclidinyl thiochromane-4-carboxylate is a research compound which is one of the most potent muscarinic antagonists known. Tests in vitro showed it to have a binding affinity over 1000 times more potent than 3-quinuclidinyl benzilate.

See also 
 CS-27349
 EA-3167
 Metixene

References 

Muscarinic antagonists
Thiochromanes
3-Quinuclidinyl esters